Alain Rohr (born 25 December 1971) is a retired Swiss athlete, who specialized in the 400 m hurdles.

Rohr finished fourth in 4 × 400 m relay at the 2004 World Indoor Championships, together with teammates Cédric El-Idrissi, Martin Leiser and Andreas Oggenfuss. Earlier, during the series, the same Swiss team had realised 3.04,09, a new national record.He finished fifth in 400 m at the 2000 European Indoor Championships.

His personal best time in the 400 m hurdles is 49.19 seconds, achieved in July 2001 in Lausanne.

References

External links

1971 births
Living people
Swiss male hurdlers
Athletes (track and field) at the 1996 Summer Olympics
Athletes (track and field) at the 2000 Summer Olympics
Olympic athletes of Switzerland